(aka: The Sword of Alexander) is a series of novels by Baku Yumemakura. They blend samurai action with sci-fi elements. The first novel was adapted into a 2007 movie directed by Yukihiko Tsutsumi.

Cast
Hiroshi Abe as Yorozu Genkurou
Kyōko Hasegawa as Princess Mai / Ran
Kankurō Kudō as Sasuke
Meisa Kuroki as Botan
Kenichi Endō as Gonzou
Naomasa Musaka as Kuromushi
Koji Ookura as Teduma no Touji
Hirotarō Honda
Masakatsu Funaki
Takashi Taniguchi

Synopsis
Orichalcum is a rare and powerful material from a meteorite that was forged into three priceless artifacts. Those that can unite the three items are said to attain great power within the universe. Two conflicting alien forces fight and crash land in ancient Japan to get Orichalcum. Yorozu Genkurou, a samurai who managed to acquire the sword called "Taitei no Ken (The Sword of Alexander)" soon realizes its true potential as he battles ninjas and aliens that covet his life and sword.

2007 science fiction films
2007 films
Films based on Japanese novels
Films directed by Yukihiko Tsutsumi
2000s Japanese-language films
Japanese science fiction films
Toei Company films
2000s Japanese films